Notwane FC is a football club from Botswana based in Gaborone. It is named after the Notwane River. Notwane is owned by GMG Global Investments, a subsidiary of GMG Holdings  and recently made major scoop by signing former South African international players, former Orlando Pirates player Benedict Vilakazi and former Mamelodi Sundowns player Manqoba Ngwenya

History
Notwane were founded in 1965 and played in the first season of the Botswana Premier League. They were relegated from the top flight for the first time in 2015.

The team sued the Botswana Football Association in 1992 after the BFA allowed Township Rollers a place in the premier league.

Notwane were promoted again in 2017. However, Notwane suffered financial difficulties which led to a financial dispute with coach 'Pio' Paul in 2018.

Achievements
Botswana Premier League: 3
1978, 1996, 1998
Botswana Challenge Cup: 4
1978, 1995, 1997, 2006
Botswana Independence Cup: 2
2003, 2004

Performance in CAF competitions
CAF Champions League: 3 appearances
1997 - First Round
1999 - Preliminary Round
2000 - Preliminary Round

CAF Confederation Cup: 1 appearance
2007 - Preliminary Round

CAF Cup Winners' Cup: 3 appearances
1979 - First Round
1996 - Second Round
1998 - First Round

References

Football clubs in Gaborone
Association football clubs established in 1965
1965 establishments in Bechuanaland Protectorate